Doʻstlik is a district of Jizzakh Region in Uzbekistan. The capital lies at the city Doʻstlik.

The district consists of one city (Doʻstlik), one urban-type settlements (Navroʻz) and 7 rural communities.

References 

Districts of Uzbekistan
Jizzakh Region